Into the Future is the ninth studio album by the American hardcore punk band Bad Brains, which was released on November 20, 2012 on Megaforce Records. It is a tribute dedication to Adam Yauch of the Beastie Boys, a longtime friend of the band who died of cancer six months before its release, and produced their previous album Build a Nation. "Popcorn" first appeared on the Bad Brains tribute album "Tribute To Bad Brains", when the band appeared under the name Soul Brains.

Reception

Into the Future has received positive reviews. Fred Thomas of AllMusic gave the album a positive review, saying that the album, like Build a Nation, "attempted a return to the ragged glory of the band's early speed-demon hardcore days, and probably came as close as possible given the years and whether they'd seen since ... turning out 13 new jams that volley between dub-styled reggae and the kind of loud-and-fast hardcore with funk and metal undertones that they've been perfecting for ages." However, he adds that "it's not quite as loud and just a little bit less fast than before."

Track listing
 "Into the Future" - 2:43
 "Popcorn" - 3:12
 "We Belong Together" - 1:39
 "Youth of Today" - 3:25
 "RubADub Love" - 2:35
 "Yes I" - 1:28
 "Suck Sess" - 1:53
 "Jah Love" - 3:35
 "Earnest Love" - 3:14
 "Come Down" - 1:25
 "Fun" - 3:47
 "Maybe a Joyful Noise" - 4:43
 "MCA Dub" - 3:47

Personnel
H.R. – vocals
Dr. Know – guitars
Darryl Jenifer – bass
Earl Hudson – drums
Jamie Saft—keyboards

References

2012 albums
Bad Brains albums